Kadiri Babu Rao is an Indian politician from the state of Andhra Pradesh. He was the former Member of the Legislative Assembly (MLA) for the Kanigiri Assembly constituency representing Telugu Desam Party (TDP). He began his political career in the TDP in mid 1980s and later shifted to YSR Congress Party (YSRCP) in 2020.

Early life 
Rao was born in Seelamvaripalli village, Prakasam district, Andhra Pradesh, to Kadiri Venkata Narasaiah, a diamond merchant. He was educated near Seelamavaripalli before his family migrated to Hyderabad. He graduated with a BA degree from Nizam college, Hyderabad in 1981.

Career 
Rao entered politics in 1980s and joined TDP, and developed a close association with Nandamuri Balakrishna.

He later filed nomination to contest the 2009 Andhra Pradesh Legislative Assembly election from Kanigiri on behalf of TDP. Upon objections raised by Mukku Ugra Narasimha Reddy, Congress' candidate to Kanigiri, of a missing signature of Rao on his filed affidavit, the nomination was rejected by the Election Commission of India.

He then contested the 2014 Andhra Pradesh Legislative Assembly election and won as the MLA from Kanigiri. He later strived to contest the 2019 Andhra Pradesh Legislative Assembly election again from Kanigiri. However, N. Chandrababu Naidu, TDP's president, did not facilitate it and fielded him from Darsi constituency. Despite rumours that Rao being upset over Naidu's decision and that he might contest from Kanigiri as an independent, he moved forward with Darsi constituency but lost the election to Maddisetty Venugopal of YSRCP.

After his 2019 defeat, Rao, dissatisfied over Naidu's decision, took a break from politics and TDP. Following reports of his plans to change his political alliance, he left TDP and joined YSR Congress Party in March 2020.

Other work 
Rao established Kadiri Babu Rao Educational Society which is used to run Kadiri Baburao College of Agriculture & Horticulture in Prakasam district.

References

Telugu politicians
People from Prakasam district
Telugu Desam Party politicians
Living people
Year of birth missing (living people)
Andhra Pradesh MLAs 2014–2019
YSR Congress Party politicians
20th-century Indian politicians
21st-century Indian politicians